Polond Desert (also Romanized as Plond Desert), also known as the Mozaffari Desert, is a desert located 40 kilometers West of Ferdows, South Khorasan Province, Iran.

Polond Desert is located inside the Mozaffari Protected Area, near the village Chah-e Polond in Ferdows County.

Places to visit 
Sandy hills and dunes adjacent to mountains form amazing landscapes. Among the unique natural attractions of the region, is a dune known as Cheetah's Tail because its shape is like a Cheetah's tail. Also Ferdows Hole-in-the-Rock and Hole-in-the-Rock Cave are located near the Polond Desert.

References

External links 
 The Whisper Desert Festival in the Polond Desert in the Town of Ferdows

Deserts of Iran
Tourist attractions in Ferdows County
Ferdows County
Geography of South Khorasan Province